Saint Margaret Engineering College (SMEC) is a private engineering college located in Neemrana, Alwar, Rajasthan, India.  The college is affiliated to the Bikaner Technical University, Rajasthan and approved by All India Council of Technical Education (AICTE), New Delhi.

History
The college was established in 2002 by Saint Margaret Education Society. The society also runs two schools (Saint Margaret Senior Secondary School, Prashant Vihar and Saint Margaret School) in Derawal Nagar in New Delhi. At the start, the college offered courses in Computer Science, Electronics and Communication, Electrical Engineering, and Information Technology. Now College also provides courses in mechanical engineering. The college had a unique reputation in a time, and things were quite unique considering the remote location(Neemrana was not a well known/developed place in 2002) in those times.

Location

St. Margaret Engineering College is situated on the Delhi-Jaipur National Highway 8 (India) at Neemrana which is an ancient historical town in the Alwar District of Rajasthan. It is about 120 km from Delhi and 140 km from Jaipur. The college is in the industrial belt of Bawal, Shahjahanpur, Neemrana, and Behror. It is about 4 km from Shahjahanpur toll barrier and about 500 meters from Neemrana.

Campus

The institute is located where a large number of national and multinational industries are already in existence. The campus includes the academic area, playgrounds and residential area. The campus has residential facilities for students and staff. The college has more than 2.5 lakh sq. ft. covered area. Other facilities include a bank with ATM, dispensary, canteen, stationery, and general store with PCO and STD facility.

Academics
SMEC offers undergraduate courses of study in engineering. The four year undergraduate programme leads to the degree of Bachelor of Engineering (BE). The courses offered are:

 Electronics and Communication Engineering
 Computer Science and Engineering
 Mechanical Engineering

SMEC also offer postgraduate courses of study in engineering. The two year postgraduate programme leads to the degree of Master of Engineering (ME). The courses offered are:

 Digital Communication
 Computer Science Engineering
 Production Engineering

External links 

Official Website

Engineering colleges in Rajasthan
Education in Alwar district
Neemrana
Educational institutions established in 2002
2002 establishments in Rajasthan